FIFA Fair Play Trophy may refer to:

 FIFA Fair Play Trophy, FIFA competition award for the team with the best record of fair play 
 FIFA World Cup - FIFA Fair Play Trophy, FIFA World Cup award for the team with the best record of fair play 
 FIFA U-20 World Cup - FIFA Fair Play Trophy, FIFA U-20 World Cup award for the team with the best record of fair play 
 FIFA U-17 World Cup - FIFA Fair Play Trophy, FIFA U-20 World Cup award for the team with the best record of fair play 
 FIFA Women's World Cup - FIFA Fair Play Trophy, FIFA Women's World Cup award for the team with the best record of fair play 
 FIFA U-20 Women's World Cup - FIFA Fair Play Trophy, FIFA U-20 Women's World Cup award for the team with the best record of fair play 
 FIFA U-17 Women's World Cup - FIFA Fair Play Trophy, FIFA U-17 Women's World Cup award for the team with the best record of fair play 
 FIFA Club World Cup - FIFA Fair Play Trophy, FIFA Club World Cup award for the team with the best record of fair play 
 FIFA Confederations Cup - FIFA Fair Play Trophy, FIFA Confederations Cup award for the team with the best record of fair play

See also
FIFA Fair Play Award

Fair Play Trophy
Young Player Award
Association football fair play awards